Amselina monorita is a moth in the family Autostichidae. It was described by László Anthony Gozmány in 1969. It is found in Turkey.

References

Moths described in 1969
Amselina